The Man with a Cross is a 1943 Italian war film directed by Roberto Rossellini and starring Alberto Tavazzi, Roswita Schmidt and Attilio Dottesio. It was the final part of Rossellini's "Fascist trilogy" following The White Ship (1941) and A Pilot Returns (1942). It is loosely inspired by Reginaldo Giuliani, an Italian military chaplain who had been killed on active service.

The film was made at Cinecittà with location shooting in the countryside around Ladispoli standing in for the Eastern Front. Although the film incorporates elements of neorealism such as the use of amateur actors in some parts, stylistically it is closer to a more conventional war film. Rossellini cast his friend, the art director Alberto Tavazzi in the title role, while his girlfriend Roswita Schmidt played the female lead.

Synopsis
The film is set in the summer of 1942 in Ukraine where Italian troops are fighting those of the Soviet Union. A military chaplain volunteers to stay behind with a badly wounded Italian soldier, even though this means certain capture.

Cast
 Alberto Tavazzi as Il cappellano militare  
 Roswita Schmidt as Irina, la miliziana  
 Attilio Dottesio as Il carrista ferito  
 Doris Hild as Una contadina russa  
 Zoia Weneda as Un'altra contadina russa  
 Antonio Marietti as Serghej, il commissario del popolo 
 Piero Pastore as Beyrov  
 Aldo Capacci as Lo studente soldato  
 Franco Castellani as Un soldato russo ferito  
 Gualtiero Isnenghi as Il ferito antibolscevico  
 Antonio Suriano as Il soldato napoletano  
 Marcello Tanzi as Diego

References

Bibliography 
Bondanella, Peter. A History of Italian Cinema. Continuum, 2009.
 Bondanella, Peter. The Films of Roberto Rossellini. Cambridge University Press, 1993.

External links 

 

1943 films
Italian war drama films
Italian black-and-white films
1940s war drama films
1940s Italian-language films
Films directed by Roberto Rossellini
World War II films made in wartime
Films set in Ukraine
Films shot in Lazio
Eastern Front of World War II films
Films shot at Cinecittà Studios
1943 drama films
Films scored by Renzo Rossellini
Italian World War II films
1940s Italian films